The United States national professional ballroom dance champions are crowned at the United States Dance Championships (formerly United States DanceSport Championships, USDSC, and United States Ballroom Championships, USBC), as recognized by the National Dance Council of America (NDCA) and the World Dance & DanceSport Council (WD&DSC).

The American Smooth division consists of American-style waltz, tango, foxtrot, and Viennese waltz.

U.S. National Champions

See also 
 U.S. National Dancesport Champions (Professional Standard)
 U.S. National Dancesport Champions (Professional Latin)
 U.S. National Dancesport Champions (Professional Rhythm)
 U.S. National Dancesport Champions (Professional 10-Dance)
 U.S. National Dancesport Champions (Professional 9-Dance)
 Dancesport World Champions (smooth)

References

External links 
 Video clip: 2000 Smooth Ballroom Dance Championships
 United States Dance Sport Championships (USDSC)
 National Dance Council of America (NDCA)
 Dancesport Competitions
 Dancesport Info

Dancesport in the United States